Flöthe is a municipality in the district of Wolfenbüttel, in Lower Saxony, Germany. Flöthe has a population of 1,120 people as of 2015.

References

Wolfenbüttel (district)